Ron Joseph (June 11, 1941, Philadelphia, Pennsylvania - April 24, 2022) was an American television producer known for his dance shows. On his shows, he was usually referred to as RJ.

Early life 
Ron Joseph began his broadcasting career in 1950 on Ghost Riders, a Philadelphia children's show on WCAU. Four years later, in 1954, Joseph was a panel member on Radio Rangers, a dramatic series on WCAU-AM. It aired on Sunday mornings and was hosted by Phil Sheridan.

In 1955, as a teenager, RJ published and edited a local newspaper, The Upper Darby Tower, in Delaware County, Pennsylvania.

TV and radio career 
The next year (1956), Ron began as a regular teenage dancer on the locally-aired Bandstand, hosted by Bob Horn and carried over WFIL.

When Dick Clark took over the show, RJ stayed on as a regular. A year later, when Bandstand went national (as American Bandstand), Ron continued as a steady dancer and became the only regular to have a dance show of his own, like Clark.

In 1960, Ron Joseph graduated from Upper Darby High and it was about that time that he joined the staff of WEEZ Radio (then licensed to Chester, Pennsylvania). He did a nightly top 40 music show on the station. For a time, he was a paid staff member.

In the meantime, there was a new TV station in town, WPCA-TV, Channel 17 in Philadelphia. Station owner Rev. Percy Crawford offered RJ his first television show, Spotlight on America. At that time, regular TV receivers couldn't pick up channels 14 and higher without attaching an UHF converter to the set.

RJ went to the same church as Philadelphia's legendary TV newsman, John Facenda, who would quite often pass along broadcast tips to RJ after the 11:15 morning mass at St. Bernadette's in Drexel Hill.

By 1966, RJ opened an "under twenty-one" discotheque on the University of Pennsylvania's campus at 40th and Walnut Streets. He also started another club, "Groove" at Broad and Locust where WIFI, 92.5 on the FM dial broadcast live. WIFI, at that time, was owned by Mel Gollub and was licensed to Norristown, Pennsylvania.

That same year, Ron began his own TV dance party on Philadelphia's WIBF-TV, Channel 29, and WPHL-TV, channel 17. He created his own version of a teen disco on television and syndicated his television show independently to such cities as Newark/New York City's WBTB-TV 68, KEMO-TV 20 and KTSF-TV 26 in San Francisco, KBSC-TV 52 in Los Angeles, KSCI-TV 18 in Hollywood and KFTY-TV 50 in Santa Rosa, California.

In 1982, Ron Joseph was broadcasting over XPRS, a Mexican radio station serving Los Angeles. The outlet had 50,000 watts and blanketed the sixteen western states, plus parts of Canada and a large part of Mexico.

Then RJ had another TV program, Teen Scene Magazine, which was carried in the Philadelphia area over WRBV-TV, Channel 65 (now Univision affiliate WUVP), a station licensed to Vineland, NJ. The show also aired over KFTY-TV, Channel 50 in Santa Rosa, California.

In 1985, RJ returned to radio on the Philadelphia Wireless Institute's station, WPWT-FM. At this same time, Ron created Beach Party USA which originated from Hunts Pier in Wildwood, NJ. The program aired over Wilmington's Channel 61, WTGI (now WPPX, iON).

The next year, RJ traveled to Europe for a new teenage motion picture, Gemini Twin Stars, starring Gene Patrick as McGinty, who was "discovered" by RJ at his teen club on South Street in Center City Philadelphia.

In 1990, RJ pioneered a new field, low-powered television (LPTV). He was the moving force behind W07CB-TV, Philadelphia, which aired old TV shows like The Lone Ranger, The Cisco Kid, RJ's old dance shows and a telephone talk show. 1992 also saw Ron starting Open Mike over Channel 53 in Atlantic City over WWAC-TV.

In 1993, he opened low-power television station, W05AX-TV in Wildwood/Cape May and four years later, in 1997, WELL-TV, Channel 8 in Willow Grove.

In 1998, RJ began a disco "block party" Sunday afternoons on WNJC Radio and Friday evenings in 2000 at Cruisin' 92.1, WVLT. He has syndicated Disco USA to independent stations across the nation including KECG-FM in Oakland, California serving San Francisco, a city RJ has become obsessed with over the years. His TV dance show, The Nostalgia Dance Party, continues to air in that market.

Ron Joseph was inducted into the Philadelphia Broadcast Pioneers in 2003.

RJ briefly hosted a Saturday-afternoon talk show on WNWR called Something To Say With RJ, from May 2006 to July 2007.

TV projects 
In 2007, Ron Joseph appeared in the motion picture Fabulous, the life story of Charlie Gracie, and in 2008, The Wages of Spin, which chronicles the Philadelphia music scene from 1952 to 1963. The film primarily focuses on Dick Clark.

External links 
 Ron Joseph's Website

Living people
1941 births
Television pioneers
Businesspeople from Philadelphia
Television producers from Pennsylvania
American television personalities